Events from the year 1951 in art.

Events
 April – The Peggy Guggenheim Collection at the Palazzo Venier dei Leoni in Venice is first opened to the public.
 May 3–September 30 – Festival of Britain, based on London's South Bank. Director Hugh Casson has assembled a team of young designers and architects to create it.
 Festival Star emblem by Abram Games.
 Royal Festival Hall by Leslie Martin, Peter Moro and Robert Matthew.
 Dome of Discovery by Ralph Tubbs.
 Skylon by Philip Powell, Hidalgo Moya and Felix Samuely.
 Riverside Restaurant, New Schools building and Waterloo entrance tower by Jane Drew with Maxwell Fry.
 Sculptures: Youth Advancing by Jacob Epstein; Reclining Figure: Festival by Henry Moore; Contrapunctal Forms and Turning Forms by Barbara Hepworth; The Islanders by Siegfried Charoux; The Sunbathers by Peter Laszlo Peri; The Industries, Heavy Light and Electricity by Karel Vogel; Four Seasons Group (reliefs) by F. E. McWilliam; and a fountain by Eduardo Paolozzi.
 Murals by Mary Fedden, Josef Herman and John Tunnard.
 Furnishing fabrics and wallpapers by Lucienne Day, notably her screen-printed fabric Calyx.
 The Arts Council of Great Britain has also commissioned work from Robert Adams, Reg Butler, Lynn Chadwick, Frank Dobson, Karin Jonzen, F. E. McWilliam, Bernard Meadows, Uli Nimptsch and Eduardo Paolozzi. Some is sited in the concurrent open-air exhibition of sculpture in Battersea Park and there is an associated exhibition Sixty Paintings for '51 at the RBA Galleries and a show of popular and traditional art, Black Eyes & Lemonade, organised by Barbara Jones at the Whitechapel Gallery.
 September 2 – Unveiling of 'restored' medieval frescoes in the war-damaged St. Mary's Church, Lübeck; in 1952, Lothar Malskat reveals that most were forged by him.
 October 9 – American photographer Alice Austen is guest of honor at the first Alice Austen Day on Staten Island following the recent 'rediscovery' of her work.
 Henri Matisse completes interior decoration of Chapelle du Rosaire de Vence.

Exhibitions
 May 2–July 29 – Sculpture and Drawings by Henry Moore retrospective exhibition at the Tate Gallery, London.
 May 21–June 10 – 9th Street Art Exhibition (otherwise known as the Ninth Street Show), stepping-out of the post war New York avant-garde, collectively known as the New York School.

Awards
 Archibald Prize: Ivor Hele – Laurie Thomas
 Sculptor Henry Moore refuses the offer of a knighthood.

Works

 Salvador Dalí
 Christ of Saint John of the Cross
 A Logician Devil (woodcut)
 M. C. Escher – lithographs
 Curl-up
 House of Stairs
 James Earle Fraser – The Arts of Peace: Music and Harvest and Aspiration and Literature
 Lucian Freud
 Girl With a White Dog
 Interior in Paddington
 Leo Friedlander – The Arts of War: Valor and Sacrifice
 Alfred Janes – Portrait of William Grant Murray
 Ellsworth Kelly - Colors for a Large Wall
 Louis le Brocquy – A Family
 Barnett Newman – Vir Heroicus Sublimis
 Pablo Picasso – Massacre in Korea
 Robert Rauschenberg – White Paintings
 Clyfford Still – Painting
 James Buchanan "Buck" Winn – The History of Ranching (mural for Pearl Brewing Company, San Antonio, Texas)
 Andrew Wyeth – Trodden Weed

Publications
 Memoirs of Thomas Jones, Penkerrig, Radnorshire, 1803 is published by the Walpole Society.

Births
 January 2 – Alexander Pogrebinsky, Ukrainian-American painter and educator
 February 4 – Wolfgang Beltracchi, born Fischer, German art forger
 February 19 - Jerry Saltz, American art critic
 April 16 – Richard Spare, English artist and printmaker
 April 16 – Pierre Toutain-Dorbec, French graphic artist and sculptor
 May 12 – Rosalind Savill, English art historian and curator
 June 22 – Humphrey Ocean, born Butler-Bowdon, English painter
 November 17 – Jack Vettriano, Scottish painter
 date unknown
 Vanley Burke, Jamaican British photographer and artist
 John Kindness, Northern Irish multi-media artist
 Robert Koenig, English wood sculptor
 Deborah Luster, American photographer
 Qu Leilei, Chinese painter
 Tanis S'eiltin, Tlingit artist

Deaths
 February 6 – Frank DuMond, American painter, illustrator and teacher (b. 1865)
 April 23 – Charles Keck, American sculptor (b. 1875)
 May 11 – Wilfrid de Glehn, English painter (b. 1871)
 June 21 – Mary Tannahill, American painter and artist in fabrics (b. 1863)
 August 10 – Tony Gaudio, Italian-born cinematographer (b. 1883)
 September 1 – Wols, German-born abstract painter and photographer (b. 1913)
 September 5 – Mário Eloy, Portuguese Expressionist painter (b. 1900)
 September 13 – Arthur Szyk, Polish-born illustrator and political artist (b. 1894)
 September 18 – Gelett Burgess, American art critic (b. 1866)
 September 26 – Lena Himmelstein, American dress designer (b. 1877)
 October 1 – Karel Teige, Czech graphic artist (b. 1900)
 November 2 – Ernest Ludvig Ipsen, American portrait painter (b. 1869)
 November 15 – Frank Weston Benson, American Impressionist painter (b. 1862)
 c. December 25 – Frank Newbould, English poster artist (b. 1887)
 Undated – Louis Legrand, French aquatint engraver (b. 1863)

See also
 1951 in fine arts of the Soviet Union

References

 
Years of the 20th century in art
1950s in art